Manuela Zoni (born 12 October 1960) is an Italian former professional tennis player.

Zoni, a junior finalist at the 1976 French Open, competed for the Italy Federation Cup team during the late 1970s. Debuting at the age of 14, she remains the youngest player to have represented Italy in the competition. She featured in a total of seven ties and won three of her eight rubbers, one in singles and two in doubles.

See also
List of Italy Fed Cup team representatives

References

External links
 
 

1960 births
Living people
Italian female tennis players